"Season's greetings" is a spoken or written greeting commonly used before or during the Christmas and holiday season.

Season's Greetings may also refer to:

 Season's Greetings (play), a 1980 play by Alan Ayckbourn
 Season's Greetings (short film), an animated short by Michael Dougherty
 Season's Greetings (album), a 1993 album by Tatsurō Yamashita

See also
 Season's Greetings from Perry Como, a 1959 album
 Season's Greetings from Moe, a 2002 album 
 Seasons Greetings from Less Than Jake, a 2014 EP
 "Season's Greetings from Sally", a vignette from Charlie Brown's Christmas Tales
 "Season's Greedings" (Lois & Clark episode)